Anton Harapi (5 January 1888 – 20 February 1946) was an Albanian Franciscan friar, educator, lecturer, publicist, and political figure during World War II. In the first years of the communist regime in Albania, he was executed due to collaboration with the Axis.

Biography

Early life
Anton Harapi was born on January 5, 1888, in Shiroka and educated in Shkodër. He had gone to secondary school at monastic schools in Meran and Hall in Tirol by the Franciscans. He had also studied theology in Rome. Harapi supported and respected the diverse religious differences of Albanians, in that religion had never divided them, they saw themselves as a single blood brotherhood.

From 1923 to 1931, he taught at the Franciscan college in Shkodër and was its director. Harapi wrote the book titled “Andrra e pretashit” translated to Pretash’s dream. It is based on a dream by Pretash Cuka Berishaj a highlander from then village of Priften inside the mountain of Gruda, (Harapi worked in the nearby Church Kisha Grudes, one of the oldest Catholic Churches in all of the Balkans). Harapi was highly esteemed for his patriotism and persuasiveness. He was highly regarded throughout Albania for the depth and eloquence of his talks and for his erudition on religious topics.

World war II
After the Union with Italy was officially dissolved, many of the laws passed after Italian invasion were revoked, and Albania was declared an independent state. The assembly announced that Albania would be governed by a regency of four- one representative from each of Albania's four major religious communities. Albanian Catholics were represented by the prior of the Franciscans in Shkodër, Father Harapi, who maintained connections with both the Kosovars and the Albanian partisans. Learning of his appointment, partisan emissaries unsuccessfully attempted to dissuade him from accepting. Hermann Neubacher seemed to have developed a warm personal relationship with Harapi, in part because Harapi had received some of his education at the monastery school of Meran and Hall in Tirol.

The leadership of the council was originally designed to rotate, but Harapi argued that as a Catholic monk he could accept no position in which he would be forced to sanction the death penalty.

Death
After the partisans declared victory in Tirana and the Germans began their withdrawal, Hermann Neubacher earnestly besought Harapi to leave the country and offered him his aircraft. However, Harapi thanked him, but informed him that God had called him to be where he was and, if it were God’s will, he would die where his duties were as a priest.

The communists, who were looking everywhere for him, broke into the house where he was staying, but could not find him. On departing, they noticed some dentures in a glass of water and went back to talk to the owner of the house. When they began to mistreat the fleeing owners, Harapi crawled out his hiding place and surrendered.

On February 14, 1946, Father Harapi, along with fellow Regency Council member Lef Nosi and former Prime Minister Maliq Bey Bushati were sentenced to death by the Military Tribunal in Tirana, accused of being quislings in the services of Italy and Germany. The court was led by General Judge Irakli Bozo and the prosecution was led by Misto Treska. The Military Court sought their execution and confiscation of their property as Axis Collaborators. During the night they were taken from their prison cell to the firing squad and shot. They were buried in an unmarked grave at an unknown location on the outskirts of Tirana.

References

20th-century Albanian politicians
Albanian Franciscans
1888 births
1946 deaths
People from Shkodër
Albanian anti-communists
Executed Albanian people
20th-century Albanian poets
19th-century Albanian people
People from Scutari vilayet
People executed by Albania by firing squad
Albanian collaborators with Fascist Italy
Albanian collaborators with Nazi Germany
Albanian people of World War II
Albanian people executed by the communist regime